Berlin is a town in Cullman County, Alabama, United States. It is located roughly five miles east of the city of Cullman in northern Alabama. U.S. Route 278 and Cullman County Road 747 intersect at Walker's Corner, considered to be the center of Berlin. The Berlin Community Center is located on U.S. Route 278, just west of the crossroads.

History
The town was originally known as Hobart, possibly named after Garret Hobart, a New Jersey Congressman who served as vice-president under William McKinley. A post office was established in the town in 1895, but was closed in 1903. The name was changed circa 1914 to honor the capital of Germany, the former homeland of many of the town's ethnic German residents. The new name was selected by John (Kritner) Kreitner. The town was incorporated in 2018.

The historic Lidy Walker Covered Bridge was located just north of Berlin at the farm of Winford I. "Lidy" Walker on Lidy's Lake from 1958 until its collapse in 2001. Originally called the Big Branch Covered Bridge, it was built near Blountsville in Blount County in 1926 and moved to Berlin 32 years later.

Residents of Berlin voted 45-23 to incorporate in 2018.

Geography

Demographics

Education
Berlin is in the Cullman County School District.

References

Footnotes

Sources
 Dale J. Travis, Covered Bridges. Lidy Walker CB: Credits. Retrieved May 19, 2013.

Towns in Alabama
Towns in Cullman County, Alabama
Populated places established in 2018